CFPL Television Tower is a  tall guyed tower for television broadcasting at London, Ontario. The structure was built in 1961 and was the second supertall TV tower to be built in Canada and the second tallest structure in Canada at that time. Only the CHCH Television Tower in Stoney Creek was taller. The current tower replaced the original  CFPL Television Tower completed in 1953.

See also
 List of masts

References

Towers completed in 1961
Communication towers in Canada
Guyed masts
Transmitter sites in Canada
1961 establishments in Ontario
Buildings and structures in London, Ontario